The 25th Satellite Awards is an award ceremony honoring the year's outstanding performers, films and television shows, presented by the International Press Academy.

The nominations were announced on February 1, 2021. The winners were announced on February 15, 2021.

Special achievement awards
Auteur Award (for singular vision and unique artistic control over the elements of production) – Emerald Fennell (Promising Young Woman)

Humanitarian Award (for making a difference in the lives of those in the artistic community and beyond) – Mark Wahlberg

Mary Pickford Award (for outstanding contribution to the entertainment industry) – Tilda Swinton

Nikola Tesla Award (for visionary achievement in filmmaking technology) – Dick Pope

Best First Feature – Channing Godfrey Peoples (Miss Juneteenth)

Stunt Performance Award – Gaëlle Cohen

Ensemble: Motion Picture – The Trial of the Chicago 7

Ensemble: Television – The Good Lord Bird

Motion picture winners and nominees

Winners are listed first and highlighted in bold.

Films with multiple nominations

Films with multiple wins

Television winners and nominees

Winners are listed first and highlighted in bold.

Series with multiple nominations

Series with multiple wins

References

External links
 International Press Academy website

Satellite Awards ceremonies
2020 film awards
2020 television awards